Dolwyddelan Castle is a Welsh castle located near Dolwyddelan in Conwy County Borough in North Wales. It is thought to have been built in the early 13th century by Llywelyn the Great, Prince of Gwynedd and Wales. Initially comprising just one tower with two floors, a second tower was built in the late 13th century, and a third floor was added to the first during repairs in the late 15th century.

Construction
The castle was built, using mostly local grit and slate rubble, as one of the Snowdonian strongholds of the princes of Gwynedd. Though there are no records of the exact construction date, it is thought that a single rectangular tower, with two floors, was built in the early 13th century. The first floor would have consisted of a main chamber with a fireplace, with a trapdoor for entrance to the basement, and the main keep's doorway would have been covered by a porch or forebuilding.

The second two-storey tower was added by Edward I during the repairs in 1283–84 and linked by an irregular curtain wall with a courtyard in the centre, with further work undertaken in 1290–92. This second tower contained a fireplace on the top floor reached by internal stairs. The castle was heavily restored between 1848 and 1850 by Baron Willoughby de Eresby during which time the battlements were added.

History

The Welsh castle, built in the early 13th century, functioned as a guard post along a main route through North Wales. It was reputed to be the birthplace of Llywelyn the Great, though it is now thought that he was born at Tomen Castell, a small tower that previously stood on a nearby hill, and that he built Dolwyddelan Castle. On 18 January 1283 the castle was captured by Edward I of England's forces during the final stages of his conquest of Wales. Some historians have suggested that there may have been a deal between the defenders of the castle and Edward I in which its surrender was negotiated.

The castle was then modified and strengthened until at least 1286 for occupation by an English garrison with recorded repairs including carpentry, the bridge, and the water mill. Edwardian troops maintained a military presence here until 1290.

In the 15th century, the upper storey and drainage system were added to the keep by local lord Maredudd ap Ieuan who acquired the lease in 1488. It was restored and partly re-modelled in the 19th century by Lord Willoughby de Eresby, who added the battlements. It was reported that in around 1810 one of the towers may have collapsed.

In 1930 the building was placed under the guardianship of the Ministry of Works. The castle is now under the protection of Cadw, which is part of the Welsh Parliament's historic environment division.

Media appearances
In 1980 the location was used for all the outdoor shots of Ulrich's castle during the making of the film Dragonslayer.

See also
 Castles in Great Britain and Ireland
 List of castles in Wales

References

External links

www.geograph.co.uk : photos of Dolwyddelan Castle

Buildings and structures completed in the 13th century
Dolwyddelan
Castles of Llywelyn the Great
Castles in Conwy County Borough
Grade I listed buildings in Conwy County Borough
Grade I listed castles in Wales
Cadw
Motte-and-bailey castles